Shreen is a band from Melbourne. They formed after the breakup of Nursery Crimes. They released one full-length album, the 11 track Accelerate (Hypnotised). Their single "Beautiful Loser" achieved high rotation on Triple J. On 14 December 1995 the band performed on the RMITV show Under Melbourne Tonight

Members
Phil Rose (Nursery Crimes)
Dave Dixon (Nursery Crimes)
James Lynch (Soulscraper, Discordia)
Scott MacArthur (Loves Ugly Children, The New Black)
James McInnes (Nursery Crimes)

Discography
 Accelerate (1995) - Hypnotised
 "Beautiful Loser"

References

Australian rock music groups
Musical groups established in 1995
Victoria (Australia) musical groups